is a Japanese athlete specialising in the triple jump. He represented his country at the 2016 Summer Olympics without qualifying for the final.

His personal bests in the event are 16.88 metres outdoors (+1.3 m/s, Hiroshima 2016) and 15.81 metres indoors (Hangzhou 2014).

International competitions

References

External links 
 
 
 

1990 births
Living people
Japanese male triple jumpers
Athletes (track and field) at the 2016 Summer Olympics
Olympic athletes of Japan
Sportspeople from Kanagawa Prefecture
Olympic male triple jumpers
20th-century Japanese people
21st-century Japanese people